Ayeshbon may refer to:
 Ayeshbon-e Olya
 Ayeshbon-e Sofla